Hassan Amcharrat (born 1948), known as Acila, is a Moroccan former footballer who played as a forward in the 1970s. At the international level, he capped for the Morocco national team, for which he played 39 matches and scored 18 goals.

International career 
He participated in two African Cup of Nations in the 1976 African Cup of Nations and the 1978 African Cup of Nations. In the first, he won the tournament, without scoring a goal. In the second, he scored the only two goals for Morocco, against Tunisia and Congo. Morocco is this time eliminated in the first round.

He also took part in 1974 FIFA World Cup qualification and 1978 FIFA World Cup qualification.

Honours 
Chabab Mohammédia

 Moroccan Throne Cup: 1974–75
 Moroccan Super Cup: 1975

Morocco

 African Cup of Nations: 1976

Notes and references

External links 

 Hassan Amcharrat at playmakerstats.com (English version of leballonrond.fr)

1948 births
People from Mohammedia
Africa Cup of Nations-winning players
1976 African Cup of Nations players
1978 African Cup of Nations players
Botola players
SCC Mohammédia players
Morocco international footballers
Living people
Association football forwards
Raja CA players
Moroccan footballers